The 1986–87 Bulgarian Cup was the 47th season of the Bulgarian Cup. CSKA Sofia won the competition, beating Levski Sofia 2–1 in the final at the Vasil Levski National Stadium in Sofia.

First round

Group 1

|-
!colspan=5 style="background-color:#D0F0C0;" |27 August / 3 September 1986

|-
!colspan=5 style="background-color:#D0F0C0;" |10 / 17 September 1986

|}
Ludogorets Razgrad was eliminated.

Group 2

|-
!colspan=5 style="background-color:#D0F0C0;" |27 August / 3 September 1986

|-
!colspan=5 style="background-color:#D0F0C0;" |10 / 17 September 1986

|}
Arda Kardzhali was eliminated.

Group 3

|-
!colspan=5 style="background-color:#D0F0C0;" |27 August / 3 September 1986

|-
!colspan=5 style="background-color:#D0F0C0;" |10 / 17 September 1986

|}
Chernomorets Burgas was eliminated.

Group 4

|-
!colspan=5 style="background-color:#D0F0C0;" |27 August / 3 September 1986

|-
!colspan=5 style="background-color:#D0F0C0;" |10 / 17 September 1986

|}
Bdin Vidin was eliminated.

Group 5

|-
!colspan=5 style="background-color:#D0F0C0;" |27 August / 3 September 1986

|-
!colspan=5 style="background-color:#D0F0C0;" |10 / 17 September 1986

|}
Vihren Sandanski was eliminated.

Group 6

|-
!colspan=5 style="background-color:#D0F0C0;" |27 August / 3 September 1986

|-
!colspan=5 style="background-color:#D0F0C0;" |10 / 17 September 1986

|}
Litex Lovech was eliminated.

Group 7

|-
!colspan=5 style="background-color:#D0F0C0;" |27 August / 3 September 1986

|-
!colspan=5 style="background-color:#D0F0C0;" |10 / 17 September 1986

|}
Chirpan was eliminated.

Group 8

|-
!colspan=5 style="background-color:#D0F0C0;" |27 August / 3 September 1986

|-
!colspan=5 style="background-color:#D0F0C0;" |10 / 17 September 1986

|}
Balkan Botevgrad was eliminated.

Second round

|-
!colspan=5 style="background-color:#D0F0C0;" |1 / 8 October 1986

|}

Third round
In this round include the four teams, who participated in the European tournaments (CSKA, Levski, Botev Plovdiv and Beroe)

|-
!colspan=4 style="background-color:#D0F0C0;" |9-10 December 1986

|}

Quarter-finals

|-
!colspan=4 style="background-color:#D0F0C0;" |11-25 February 1987

|}

Semi-finals

Third place play-off

Final

Details

References

1986-87
1986–87 domestic association football cups
Cup